Dimitrije (28 October 1846 – 6 April 1930) was the first Patriarch of the reunified Serbian Orthodox Church, from 1920 until his death. He was styled "His Holiness, the Archbishop of Peć, Metropolitan of Belgrade and Karlovci, and Serbian Patriarch".

Dimitrije Pavlović was born on 28 October 1846 in Požarevac, Serbia. He was appointed Bishop of Niš in 1884, and held that title until 1889. He then became Bishop of Šabac-Valjevo in 1898 and held that title until 1905. When Inokentije, Metropolitan of Belgrade, died in 1905, Dimitrije was appointed the successor. In 1920, the Serbian Patriarchate was re-established, thus Dimitrije became the first head of the re-established patriarchate. On 8 June 1922, he wed King Alexander I and Princess Maria of Romania in the Cathedral Church in Belgrade. Patriarch Dimitrije died on 6 April 1930 in Belgrade and was buried in the Rakovica monastery.

He was decorated Order of Saint Sava and Albanian Order of Skanderbeg for his help for Albanian Orthodox Church.

See also 
 List of 20th-century religious leaders

References

Sources
 
 
 

1846 births
1930 deaths
People from Požarevac
People from the Principality of Serbia
Patriarchs of the Serbian Orthodox Church
Metropolitans of Belgrade
Recipients of the Order of St. Sava
Eastern Orthodox Christians from Serbia
19th-century Eastern Orthodox bishops
20th-century Eastern Orthodox bishops
Burials at Serbian Orthodox monasteries and churches